Miniliner S.r.L., trading as MiniLiner was a cargo airline based in Bergamo, Italy. It operated scheduled and ad hoc cargo services. Its main base is Orio al Serio Airport. Its license was suspended on 31 January 2015.

History 
On 31 January 2015, the Italian authorities revoked the company's air operator's certificate due to its financial situation. MiniLiner can therefore no longer operate any flights until further notice.

Fleet

The MiniLiner historical fleet includes the following aircraft:

References

External links 

 
MiniLiner Fleet

Defunct airlines of Italy
Airlines established in 1981
Defunct cargo airlines
2015 disestablishments in Italy
Airlines disestablished in 2015
Italian companies established in 1981